The New York Hat  is a silent short film which was released in 1912, directed by D. W. Griffith from a screenplay by Anita Loos, and starring Mary Pickford, Lionel Barrymore, and Lillian Gish.

Production
The New York Hat is one of the most notable of the Biograph Studios short films and is perhaps the best known example of Pickford's early work, and an example of Anita Loos'  witty writing. The film was made by  Biograph when it and many other early U.S. movie studios were based in Fort Lee, New Jersey at the beginning of the 20th century.

Plot
Mollie Goodhue leads a cheerless, impoverished life, largely because of her stern, miserly father.  Mrs. Goodhue is mortally ill, but before dying, she gives the minister, Preacher Bolton, some money with which to buy her daughter the "finery" her father always forbade her.

Mollie is delighted when the minister presents her with a fashionable New York hat she has been longing for, but village gossips misinterpret the minister's intentions and spread malicious rumors.  Mollie becomes a social pariah, and her father tears up the beloved hat in a rage.

All ends well, however, after the minister produces a letter from Mollie's mother about the money she left the minister to spend on Mollie. Soon afterwards, he proposes to Mollie, who accepts his offer of marriage.

Cast

See also
 D. W. Griffith filmography
 Lillian Gish filmography
 Lionel Barrymore filmography

References

External links

 The New York Hat on YouTube
The New York Hat available for download from Archive.org

1912 films
American black-and-white films
American silent short films
Films directed by D. W. Griffith
1912 drama films
Films shot in Fort Lee, New Jersey
Films with screenplays by Anita Loos
1912 short films
Silent American drama films
Articles containing video clips
Films with screenplays by Frances Marion
1910s American films
1910s English-language films
English-language drama films
American drama short films